In machine learning, a common task is the study and construction of algorithms that can learn from and make predictions on data. Such algorithms function by making data-driven predictions or decisions, through building a mathematical model from input data. These input data used to build the model are usually divided in multiple data sets. In particular, three data sets are commonly used in different stages of the creation of the model: training, validation, and test sets.

The model is initially fit on a training data set, which is a set of examples used to fit the parameters (e.g. weights of connections between neurons in artificial neural networks) of the model. The model (e.g. a naive Bayes classifier) is trained on the training data set using a supervised learning method, for example using optimization methods such as gradient descent or stochastic gradient descent. In practice, the training data set often consists of pairs of an input vector (or scalar) and the corresponding output vector (or scalar), where the answer key is commonly denoted as the target (or label). The current model is run with the training data set and produces a result, which is then compared with the target, for each input vector in the training data set. Based on the result of the comparison and the specific learning algorithm being used, the parameters of the model are adjusted. The model fitting can include both variable selection and parameter estimation.

Successively, the fitted model is used to predict the responses for the observations in a second data set called the validation data set. The validation data set provides an unbiased evaluation of a model fit on the training data set while tuning the model's hyperparameters (e.g. the number of hidden units—layers and layer widths—in a neural network). Validation datasets can be used for regularization by early stopping (stopping training when the error on the validation data set increases, as this is a sign of over-fitting to the training data set).
This simple procedure is complicated in practice by the fact that the validation dataset's error may fluctuate during training, producing multiple local minima. This complication has led to the creation of many ad-hoc rules for deciding when over-fitting has truly begun.

Finally, the test data set is a data set used to provide an unbiased evaluation of a final model fit on the training data set. If the data in the test data set has never been used in training (for example in cross-validation), the test data set is also called a holdout data set. The term "validation set" is sometimes used instead of "test set" in some literature (e.g., if the original data set was partitioned into only two subsets, the test set might be referred to as the validation set).

Deciding the sizes and strategies for data set division in training, test and validation sets is very dependent on the problem and data available.

Training data set 
A training data set is a data set of examples used during the learning process and is used to fit the parameters (e.g., weights) of, for example, a classifier. 

For classification tasks, a supervised learning algorithm looks at the training data set to determine, or learn, the optimal combinations of variables that will generate a good predictive model. The goal is to produce a trained (fitted) model that generalizes well to new, unknown data. The fitted model is evaluated using “new” examples from the held-out datasets (validation and test datasets) to estimate the model’s accuracy in classifying new data. To reduce the risk of issues such as over-fitting, the examples in the validation and test datasets should not be used to train the model.

Most approaches that search through training data for empirical relationships tend to overfit the data, meaning that they can identify and exploit apparent relationships in the training data that do not hold in general.

Validation data set 
A validation data set is a data-set of examples used to tune the hyperparameters (i.e. the architecture) of a classifier. It is sometimes also called the development set or the "dev set". An example of a hyperparameter for artificial neural networks includes the number of hidden units in each layer. It, as well as the testing set (as mentioned below), should follow the same probability distribution as the training data set.

In order to avoid overfitting, when any classification parameter needs to be adjusted, it is necessary to have a validation data set in addition to the training and test datasets. For example, if the most suitable classifier for the problem is sought, the training data set is used to train the different candidate classifiers, the validation data set is used to compare their performances and decide which one to take and, finally, the test data set is used to obtain the performance characteristics such as accuracy, sensitivity, specificity, F-measure, and so on. The validation data set functions as a hybrid: it is training data used for testing, but neither as part of the low-level training nor as part of the final testing.

The basic process of using a validation data set for model selection (as part of training data set, validation data set, and test data set) is:

An application of this process is in early stopping, where the candidate models are successive iterations of the same network, and training stops when the error on the validation set grows, choosing the previous model (the one with minimum error).

Test data set 
A test data set is a data set that is independent of the training data set, but that follows the same probability distribution as the training data set. If a model fit to the training data set also fits the test data set well, minimal overfitting has taken place (see figure below). A better fitting of the training data set as opposed to the test data set usually points to over-fitting.

A test set is therefore a set of examples used only to assess the performance (i.e. generalization) of a fully specified classifier. To do this, the final model is used to predict classifications of examples in the test set. Those predictions are compared to the examples' true classifications to assess the model's accuracy.

In a scenario where both validation and test datasets are used, the test data set is typically used to assess the final model that is selected during the validation process. In the case where the original data set is partitioned into two subsets (training and test datasets), the test data set might assess the model only once (e.g., in the holdout method). Note that some sources advise against such a method. However, when using a method such as cross-validation, two partitions can be sufficient and effective since results are averaged after repeated rounds of model training and testing to help reduce bias and variability.

Confusion in terminology 

Testing is trying something to find out about it ("To put to the proof; to prove the truth, genuineness, or quality of by experiment" according to the Collaborative International Dictionary of English) and 
to validate is to prove that something is valid ("To confirm; to render valid" Collaborative International Dictionary of English). With this perspective, the most common use of the terms test set and validation set is the one here described. However, in both industry and academia, they are sometimes used interchanged, by considering that the internal process is testing different models to improve (test set as a development set) and the final model is the one that needs to be validated before real use with an unseen data (validation set). "The literature on machine learning often reverses the meaning of 'validation' and 'test' sets. This is the most blatant example of the terminological confusion that pervades artificial intelligence research. Nevertheless, the important concept that must be kept is that the final set, whether called test or validation, should only be used in the final experiment.

Cross-validation 
In order to get more stable results and use all valuable data for training, a data set can be repeatedly split into several training and a validation datasets. This is known as cross-validation. To confirm the model's performance, an additional test data set held out from cross-validation is normally used.

See also 
 Statistical classification
 List of datasets for machine learning research
 Hierarchical classification

References 

Datasets in machine learning
Validity (statistics)